The West Daly Regional Council is a local government area of the Northern Territory, Australia. During the wet season between late November and early May, travel between the three main communities of Nganmarriyanga, Peppimenarti and Wadeye is limited to air as roads are cut by flooding.

History
The West Daly Region came into existence on 1 July 2014 when the boundaries on the western side of the Victoria Daly Region were changed with the effect that the following three wards from the Victoria Daly Region were transferred to the new local government area - Nganmarriyanga, Thamarrurr/Pindi Pindi and Tyemirri.

Wards
The West Daly Regional Council is divided into the following three wards which are represented by a total of six councillors:
 Nganmarriyanga (one councillor)
 Thamamurr/Pindi Pindi (four councillors)
 Tyemirri (one councillor)

Localities and communities
The West Daly Region consists of the communities of  Nganmarriyanga,  Peppimenarti and  Wadeye, all of the locality of Thamarrurr and the western side of the locality of Nemarluk.

References

External links
 West Daly Region website
 Map of LGAs

Local government areas of the Northern Territory